Rothley Castle is an 18th-century gothic folly built to resemble a medieval castle, situated at Rothley, Northumberland. It is a Grade II* listed building.

It was designed in 1755 by architect Daniel Garrett for Sir Walter Blackett, owner of Wallington Hall, from where it is visible on the skyline. A genuine medieval tower, known as Rothley Tower (which stood nearby), was demolished, probably early in the 19th century.

A similar gothic folly, also part of the Wallington estate, is Codger Fort, on crags about a mile north of Rothley Castle. It is in the form of a triangular gun battery, and was designed by Thomas Wright of Durham.

Both Wallington and Rothley Castle are in the ownership of the National Trust.

References

Grade II* listed buildings in Northumberland
Castles in Northumberland
Ruins in Northumberland
Folly castles in England